In demographics, the center of population (or population center) of a region is a geographical point that describes a centerpoint of the region's population.  There are several ways of defining such a "center point", leading to different geographical locations; these are often confused.

Definitions
Three commonly used (but different) center points are:
 the mean center, also known as the centroid or center of gravity;
 the median center, which is the intersection of the median longitude and median latitude;
 the geometric median, also known as Weber point, Fermat–Weber point, or point of minimum aggregate travel.

A further complication is caused by the curved shape of the Earth. Different center points are obtained depending on whether the center is computed in three-dimensional space, or restricted to the curved surface, or computed using a flat map projection.

Mean center
The mean center, or centroid, is the point on which a rigid, weightless map would balance perfectly, if the population members are represented as points of equal mass.

Mathematically, the centroid is the point to which the population has the smallest possible sum of squared distances.  It is easily found by taking the arithmetic mean of each coordinate.  If defined in the three-dimensional space, the centroid of points on the Earth's surface is actually inside the Earth.  This point could then be projected back to the surface.  Alternatively, one could define the centroid directly on a flat map projection; this is, for example, the definition that the US Census Bureau uses.

Contrary to a common misconception, the centroid does not minimize the average distance to the population. That property belongs to the geometric median.

Median center
The median center is the intersection of two perpendicular lines, each of which divides the population into two equal halves. Typically these two lines are chosen to be a parallel (a line of latitude) and a meridian (a line of longitude).  In that case, this center is easily found by taking separately the medians of the population's latitude and longitude coordinates. John Tukey called this the cross median.

Geometric median
The geometric median is the point to which the population has the smallest possible sum of distances (or equivalently, the smallest average distance).  Because of this property, it is also known as the point of minimum aggregate travel. Unfortunately, there is no direct closed-form expression for the geometric median; it is typically computed using iterative methods.

Determination
In practical computation, decisions are also made on the granularity (coarseness) of the population data, depending on population density patterns or other factors. For instance, the center of population of all the cities in a country may be different from the center of population of all the states (or provinces, or other subdivisions) in the same country. Different methods may yield different results.

Practical uses for finding the center of population include locating possible sites for forward capitals, such as Brasília, Nur-Sultan or Austin, and, along the same lines, to make tax collection easier. Practical selection of a new site for a capital is a complex problem that depends also on population density patterns and transportation networks.

World

It is important to use a method that does not depend on a two-dimensional projection when dealing with the entire world. In a study from the Institut national d'études démographiques, the solution methodology deals only with the globe. As a result, the answer is independent of which map projection is used or where it is centered. As described above, the exact location of the center of population will depend on both the granularity of the population data used, and the distance metric. The data used in the reference support this result to a precision of only a few hundred kilometers, hence the exact location is not known. Another analysis utilising city level population data found that the world's center of population is located close to Almaty, Kazakhstan.

By country

Australia
Australia's population centroid is in central New South Wales. By 1996 it had moved only a little to the north-west since 1911.

Canada
In Canada, a 1986 study placed the point of minimum aggregate travel just north of Toronto in the city of Richmond Hill, and moving westward at a rate of approximately 2 metres per day.

China
China's population centroid has wandered within southern Henan from 1952 to 2005. Incidentally, the two end point dates are remarkably close to each other. China also plots its economic centroid or center of economy/GDP, which has also wandered, and is generally located at the eastern Henan borders.

Estonia

The center of population of Estonia was on the northwestern shore of Lake Võrtsjärv in 1913 and moved an average of 6 km northwest with every decade until the 1970s. The higher immigration rates during the late Soviet occupation to mostly Tallinn and Northeastern Estonia resulted the center of population moving faster towards north and continuing urbanization has seen it move northwest towards Tallinn since the 1990s. The center of population according to the 2011 census was in Jüri, just 6 km southeast from the border of Tallinn.

Finland
In Finland, the point of minimum aggregate travel is located in the former municipality of Hauho. It is moving slightly to the south-west-west every year because people are moving out of the peripheral areas of northern and eastern Finland.

Germany
In Germany, the centroid of the population is located in Spangenberg, Hesse, close to Kassel.

Great Britain
The centre of population in Great Britain did not move significantly in the 20th century. In 1901, it was in Rodsley, Derbyshire and in 1911 in Longford. In 1971 it was at Newhall, Swadlincote, South Derbyshire and in 2000, it was in Appleby Parva, Leicestershire. Using the 2011 census the population center can be calculated at Snarestone, Swadlincote.

Ireland
The center of population of the entire island of Ireland is located near Kilcock, County Kildare. This is significantly further east than the Geographical centre of Ireland, reflecting the disproportionately large cities of the east of the island (Belfast and Dublin). The center of population of the Republic of Ireland is located southwest of Edenderry, County Offaly.

Japan
The centroid of population of Japan is in Gifu Prefecture, almost directly north of Nagoya city, and has been moving east-southeast for the past few decades. More recently, the only large regions in Japan with significant population growth have been in Greater Nagoya and Greater Tokyo.

New Zealand

In June 2008, New Zealand's median center of population was located near Taharoa, around 100 km (65 mi) southwest of Hamilton on the North Island's west coast. In 1900 it was near Nelson and has been moving steadily north (towards Auckland, the country's most populous city) ever since.

Sweden
The demographical center of Sweden (using the median center definition) is Hjortkvarn in Hallsberg Municipality, Örebro county. Between the 1989 and 2007 census the point moved a few kilometres to the south, due to a decreasing population in northern Sweden and immigration to the south.

Russia

Taiwan
The center of population of Taiwan is located in Heping District, Taichung.

United States

The mean center of the United States population (using the centroid definition) has been calculated for each U.S. Census since 1790. Over the last two centuries, it has progressed westward and, since 1930, southwesterly, reflecting population drift.

See also
 Extremes on Earth

Sources

 Bellone F. and Cunningham R. (1993). "All Roads Lead to... Laxton, Digby and Longford." Statistics Canada 1991 Census Short Articles Series.

References

External links
Australian parliamentary research paper with map of population centroids.
U.S. Census Bureau: Centers of Population

 
Lists of coordinates
Demography
Population